Grande Lisboa or Greater Lisbon is a former Portuguese NUTS III subregion integrated in the Lisboa Region. It was abolished at the January 2015 NUTS 3 revision. It is part of the historical Estremadura Province. It includes the capital and prime city of Portugal, Lisbon (Lisboa in Portuguese). It is the main economical subregion of the country. It covers 1,376 km2 and it is the most populous and most densely populated Portuguese subregion (2,042,477 inhabitants and 1,483.6 inhabitants/km2).

Overview
In spite of getting the name Grande Lisboa, the subregion did not take the entire area of the Lisbon metropolitan area, because it does not include the municipalities on the South bank of the Tagus river estuary, known as Península de Setúbal, which the term at times also applied to.

The area is bordered in the North by the Centro Region, in the West by the Atlantic Ocean, in the East by the Ribatejo region and in the South by the Tagus River estuary.

This subregion is the leading services center for the entire country and it also has a large industrial output. It is served by the busiest Portuguese airport, an international harbor and an extensive network of highways, and mass transportation, like commuter, regional and international railways.

Municipalities

The main urban centers are Lisboa, Amadora, Algueirão-Mem Martins, Agualva-Cacém, Queluz and Odivelas.

References

External links

Former NUTS 3 statistical regions of Portugal
Lisboa Region
Geography of Lisbon